TOA Technologies is an American software company that provides software as a service-based field service management software and customer appointment scheduling solutions and services to enterprises worldwide. Headquartered in Beachwood, Ohio, the company develops, markets and sells ETAdirect, a web-based applications solution that provides advanced tools for companies with small, medium and large mobile workforces to automate and optimize planning, scheduling, appointment booking, as well as routing and job allocation and real-time management of any type of field service event. ETAdirect include applications for forecasting, capacity management, routing, real-time field management/dispatch and an advanced HTML5-based mobility app for field employees. It also includes apps for collaboration, location-based information and customer communications. TOA Technologies was acquired by Oracle in 2014.

ETAdirect
ETAdirect is powered by a patented algorithm that continuously learns mobile employees’ work patterns, analyzes them statistically and uses pattern recognition to accurately predict an employee's time of arrival at a customer's location and the length that each job/appointment will take, thereby providing enhanced accuracy for planning and customer experience management. ETAdirect typically narrows the wait window to less than 60 minutes. Using time-based predictions, ETAdirect can communicate to consumers the exact time that a field service employee will arrive via voice/IVR, email, text/sms, Twitter and other communications channels, reducing customer frustration, wasted time and inquiry calls to service provider call centers. The software is delivered to businesses over the Internet using a software as a service/eSaaS model.

ETAdirect is currently used by several cable television companies in North America, including Cox Communications, broadband operators in Europe, such as Virgin Media and ONO (Spain)., global communications companies such as Telefonica and global utility companies like E.ON.

Company information
TOA Technologies was founded by Yuval Brisker and Irad Carmi in 2003. The company is privately held and employs more than 550 employees worldwide and is headquartered in Beachwood, Ohio, with additional offices in London, United Kingdom, and Sao Paulo, Brazil. Principal venture shareholders are Technology Crossover Ventures, Draper Triangle Ventures (a DFJ network affiliate), Intel Capital and Sutter Hill Ventures.

TOA stands for "Time of Arrival." The concept of time is central to the ETAdirect software solution set, as its central algorithm measures time and predicts performance based on resource specific pattern recognition and predictive analytics. This yields more accurate time of arrival estimates than the alternative of managing service appointments according to averages of human resource capabilities and availability.

As of December 2013, TOA had over 85,000 users.

Oracle Corporation announced that it was acquiring TOA Technologies on July 31, 2014.

Patents
On April 6, 2010, TOA was issued U.S. Patent No. 7,693,735 entitled "Dynamic Schedule Mediation" for its predictive, performance-pattern based mobile workforce management system and proactive customer communications methodology.

Milestones
In October 2012, Gartner recognized TOA Technologies as a Leader in the Magic Quadrant for Field Service Management for the first time.

TOA Technologies was again named a Leader in the Gartner Magic Quadrant for Field Service Management in 2013. In the report Gartner stated that "TOA is a best-of-breed field service optimization vendor based solely in the cloud."

TOA was named one of America's Most Promising Companies in 2013 by Forbes magazine.

In July 2013, TOA closed a major round of funding with Technology Crossover Ventures, raising $66 million to transform global field service management.

On July 31, 2014, Oracle Corporation announced that it was buying TOA Technologies. The transaction closed in mid-September, 2014.

See also
 Software as a service
 Decision support system
 Service chain optimization
 Field service management
 Enterprise mobility management
 Customer relationship management
 Customer experience management
 Workforce management
 Vehicle routing problem

References

Software companies based in Ohio
Centralized computing
Cloud computing providers
Service-oriented (business computing)
Administrative software
Oracle acquisitions
2014 mergers and acquisitions
Defunct software companies of the United States